Split-C is a parallel extension of the C programming language. The Split-C project website describes Split-C as:

a parallel extension of the C programming language that supports efficient access to a global address space on current distributed memory multiprocessors. It retains the "small language" character of C and supports careful engineering and optimization of programs by providing a simple, predictable cost model.

Development of Split-C appears to be at a standstill since 1996.  Split-C is similar to Cilk.

Notes

References 
 Krishnamurthy, A., Culler, D. E., Dusseau, A., Goldstein, S. C., Lumetta, S., von Eicken, T., and Yelick, K. 1993. Parallel programming in Split-C. In Proceedings of the 1993 ACM/IEEE Conference on Supercomputing (Portland, Oregon, United States). Supercomputing '93. ACM Press, New York, NY, 262-273. http://doi.acm.org/10.1145/169627.169724, http://www.eecs.berkeley.edu/Research/Projects/CS/parallel/castle/split-c/split-c.tr.html

External links 
 Parallel Programming in Split-C
 Introduction to Split-C

Concurrent programming languages
C programming language family